Van 't Wout is a surname primarily belonging to a Dutch family that conducts its business through Indiana Finance BV. As of 2016 the company was responsible for 40–51% of Dutch trade with Cuba.

History 
Family head Willem Van 't Wout started his financial career during World War II, stealing yeast from the occupying Germans and selling it to a bakery. In the 1950s he started trading scrap metal internationally, specializing in "politically complicated countries". After his first encounter with Fidel Castro, he bought a large amount of Cuban nickel, the country's most important export at that time.

Quote Magazine once listed Van 't Wout as the 384th wealthiest Dutchman. In 1991, he was elected Rotterdammer of the year. He is the official Cuba expert retained by Dutch investigative news journalism television show Netwerk. As of 2006, Van 't Wout was preparing to retire and hand over the business to his relatives. He later closed a deal to deliver two hundred used Rotterdam city buses to Cuba, where Dutch buses have been in use for years. Indiana Finance had a turnover of 178 million euros in 2005, 30% of which was accounted for by trade with Cuba.

Castro's 2006 illness did not influence business since trade was conducted largely with Cuban ministers. The Van 't Wouts say they are apolitical: "As a trade organisation you can't really bring about a regime change."

Descendants 

Daughter Merel is a fashion designer and served as Castro's personal tailor, convincing him to occasionally change from his customary military attire to a business suit. She claimed that "green doesn't suit him at all". Unlike her father, who regularly referred to him as "Señor Presidente", she was less formal, choosing instead to address Castro as "Fidel". Merel often amicably slapped Castro on the shoulder, an approach he appreciated and one that helped build his trust in her.

References

External links
"Cuban trade will continue without Fidel", in Volkskrant, a Dutch daily newspaper
"Bartering fridges for Cuban nickel", in Algemeen Dagblad, a Dutch daily newspaper

 Official website of Indiana Finance B.V.

 

Businesspeople from Rotterdam